In music, Op. 44 stands for Opus number 44. Compositions that are assigned this number include:

 Beethoven – Variations on an original theme in E-flat major
 Britten – Spring Symphony
 Bruch – Violin Concerto No. 2
 Busoni – Indian Fantasy
 Chopin – Polonaise in F-sharp minor, Op. 44
 Danzi – Horn Sonata No. 2
 Dvořák – Serenade for Wind Instruments
 Elgar – Coronation Ode
 Ginastera – Popol Vuh
 Goehr – Behold the Sun
 Górecki – Miserere
 Mendelssohn – String Quartet No. 3
 Mendelssohn – String Quartet No. 4
 Mendelssohn – String Quartet No. 5
 Nielsen – String Quartet No. 4
 Oswald – Cello Sonata No. 2
 Prokofiev – Symphony No. 3
 Rachmaninoff – Symphony No. 3
 Saint-Saëns – Piano Concerto No. 4
 Schumann – Piano Quintet
 Sibelius – Valse triste
 Strauss – Notturno
 Tchaikovsky – Piano Concerto No. 2